Convergence is the 12th album by trumpeter Dave Douglas. It was released on the Italian Soul Note label in 1998 and features performances by Douglas, Mark Feldman, Erik Friedlander, Drew Gress and Michael Sarin.

Reception
The Penguin Guide to Jazz selected this album as part of its suggested Core Collection.

The Allmusic review by Alex Henderson awarded the album 4½ stars stating "You can hear a variety of influences in Douglas' playing -- everyone from Lester Bowie and Don Cherry to Miles Davis and Booker Little -- but Convergence leaves no doubt that he is very much an original himself".

Track listing
 "Chit Kyoo Thwe Tog Nyin Hmar Lar" (Traditional Burmese) - 1:13
 "Joe's Auto Glass" - 6:31
 "Tzotzil Maya" - 7:47
 "Meeting At Infinity" - 15:53
 "Desseins Eternels" (Messiaen) - 4:08
 "Bilbao Song" (Weill) - 8:36
 "Border Stories: The Story" -  0:30
 "Border Stories: The Elaboration" - 0:55
 "Border Stories: The Exaggeration" - 0:41
 "Border Stories: Apocrypha" - 0:43
 "Collateral Damages" - 6:59
 "Goodbye Tony" - 13:37
 "Nothing Like You" (Dorough, Landesman) - 4:14
All compositions by Dave Douglas except as indicated
Recorded at Sound on Sound, New York City on January 22 and 23, 1998

Personnel
Dave Douglas – trumpet
Mark Feldman – violin
Erik Friedlander – cello
Drew Gress – bass
Michael Sarin – drums

References

1999 albums
Dave Douglas (trumpeter) albums
Black Saint/Soul Note albums